The king of Iraq was Iraq's head of state and monarch from 1921 to 1958. He served as the head of the Iraqi monarchy—the Hashemite dynasty. The king was addressed as His Majesty (صاحب الجلالة).

History

In the aftermath of World War I and the dissolution of the Ottoman Empire, the three provinces (vilayets) of Ottoman Iraq came under the control of the United Kingdom. Under British occupation, the people rebelled and Iraq showed itself a hard land to govern. In order to establish a pro-British client regime, a dynasty of Hashemite kings from the Hejaz region was established, beginning with Faisal I who was the son of Hussein bin Ali. As a family originating in the Hejaz, the House of Hashim was foreign to Iraq. The British Government appointed them as Iraq's royal family after a rigged plebiscite in 1921. The Hashemites were largely opposed by the Iraqi Shiites and Kurds. The Kingdom of Iraq existed until an Iraqi nationalist coup d'état in 1958 known as the 14 July Revolution established the Iraqi Republic.

King-designate of Iraq (1920)

Kings of Iraq (1921–1958)

Timeline

Royal standard

See also

 Mesopotamia
 List of Mesopotamian dynasties
 List of Assyrian kings
 List of kings of Akkad
 List of kings of Babylon
 President of Iraq
 List of presidents of Iraq
 List of Sunni dynasties

References

Iraq
Kings
Kings
 
 
Kings of Iraq